The decolonisation of Oceania occurred after World War II when nations in Oceania achieved independence by transitioning from European colonial rule to full independence.

While most of the countries of Oceania have a specific independence day, the independence of Australia and the independence of New Zealand were a gradual process and cannot be associated clearly with a specific date. Most of the British colonies in Australia gained responsible government in the 1850s, as did New Zealand in 1856. This was formalised into Dominion status in the 1900s, but with the United Kingdom retaining certain (disused) powers de jure. Although they were de facto sovereign states by the 1920s, Australia and New Zealand refused the formal recognition of their full sovereignty when offered through the Statute of Westminster in 1931, before accepting it respectively in 1942 and 1947.

Timeline

Oceania

Oceania
This is a list of all present sovereign states in Oceania and their predecessors. The region of Oceania is generally defined geographically to include the subregions of Australasia, Melanesia, Micronesia and Polynesia, and their respective sovereign states. 
Oceania was originally colonised by Europeans with Australia and New Zealand primarily by the British, and the Pacific Islands primarily by the British, French and Dutch. Today, Oceania consists of fourteen sovereign states of various government types, the most common consisting of parliamentary systems.

See also 

 Current United Nations list of non-self-governing territories
 Current list of dependent territories
 Colonialism
 Colonisation of Australia
 Colonisation of New Zealand
 Decolonisation
 Indigenous peoples of Oceania
 Wars of national liberation

Notes 

Decolonization
History of Oceania
European colonisation in Oceania
Decolonization by region